Owls Head, Nova Scotia may refer to:
 Owls Head, Halifax, Nova Scotia
 Owls Head, Lunenburg County, Nova Scotia